Ronald Joseph (born October 9, 1944) is an American former pair skater who competed with his sister, Vivian Joseph. They are the 1964 Olympic bronze medalists, 1965 World silver medalists, and 1965 North American champions.

Personal life 
Ronald Joseph was born on October 9, 1944 in Chicago, Illinois and is the elder brother of Vivian Joseph. He is Jewish and worked as a hand surgeon in Arizona and Florida.  Now retired.

Career 
The Josephs began competing together by the late 1950s and became the U.S. national junior champions in 1961. They won the senior bronze medal in 1962 and silver the following year. They were assigned to the 1963 North American Championships, where they took the bronze medal, and to the 1963 World Championships, where they placed eighth.

The Josephs were selected to represent the United States at the 1964 Winter Olympics in Innsbruck and initially finished fourth. A few years later, the silver medalists, Marika Kilius / Hans-Jürgen Bäumler of Germany, were disqualified after they were accused of signing a pro contract before the Olympics. The original bronze medalists, Debbi Wilkes / Guy Revell of Canada, were elevated to silver and the Joseph siblings to bronze. When the German pair was reinstated in 1987, the IOC decided the Germans and Canadians were both silver medalists and the Americans remained bronze medalists. The IOC officially updated the results in November 2014.

The Josephs won the national senior title in 1965. They then took gold at the 1965 North American Championships and silver at the 1965 World Championships before retiring from competition. They were coached by Peter Dunfield.

Results
(Pairs with Vivian Joseph)

See also
List of select Jewish figure skaters

References

Jews in Sports bio

Navigation

1944 births
Living people
Figure skaters from Chicago
American male pair skaters
Figure skaters at the 1964 Winter Olympics
Jewish American sportspeople
Northwestern University alumni
World Figure Skating Championships medalists
Medalists at the 1964 Winter Olympics
Olympic bronze medalists for the United States in figure skating
21st-century American Jews